Kirsten Munk (sometimes "Christina Munk"; 6 July 1598  19 April 1658) was a Danish noble, the second spouse of King Christian IV of Denmark, and mother to twelve of his children.

Early life and morganatic marriage
Kirsten Munk was the daughter of Ludvig Munk (1537–1602) and Ellen Marsvin (1572–1649), members of the wealthy but untitled Danish nobility. Her mother, widowed a second time in 1611, was the greatest landowner on Funen. 

Prior to yielding Kirsten to the evident desires of King Christian, her mother negotiated that, because Kirsten was a member of the nobility and not a commoner, she would become his wife rather than his mistress, and that she receive properties in her own name as tokens of the king's honourable intentions. On 31 December 1615, she was married morganatically to the widowed king, but not within a church. In 1627, she was given the title Countess of Schleswig-Holstein. Kirsten bore the king twelve children, among them the Countess Leonora Christina Ulfeldt.

Children 

She had 12 children. The youngest, Dorothea Elisabeth, was rumoured not to have been the king's child;

Unnamed stillborn child (b. & d. 1615)
Unnamed infant (b. & d. 1617)
Countess Anne Cathrine of Schleswig-Holstein (10 August 1618 – 20 August 1633)
Countess Sophie Elisabeth of Schleswig-Holstein (20 September 1619 – 29 April 1657); married 
Countess Leonora Christina of Schleswig-Holstein (8 July 1621 – 16 March 1698); married Corfitz Ulfeldt
Count Valdemar Christian of Schleswig-Holstein (1622 – 26 February 1656)
Countess Elisabeth Auguste of Schleswig-Holstein (28 December 1623 – 9 August 1677); married 
Count Friedrich Christian of Schleswig-Holstein (26 April 1625 – 17 July 1627)
Countess Christiane of Schleswig-Holstein (15 July 1626 – 6 May 1670); married Hannibal Sehested
Countess Hedwig of Schleswig-Holstein (15 July 1626 – 5 October 1678); married Ebbe Ulfeldt
Countess Maria Katharina of Schleswig-Holstein (29 May 1628 – 1 September 1628)
Countess Dorothea Elisabeth of Schleswig-Holstein (1 September 1629 – 18 March 1687)

Her children intermarried with the nobility of Denmark, Corfitz Ulfeldt and Hannibal Sehested being among her ambitious sons-in-law. From the king's death in 1648 to 1652, five of her daughters' husbands were known as the so-called Sons-in-law Party, wielding dominant influence in the Rigsråd. Previously, Kirsten's son Count Valdemar of Schleswig-Holstein, had shown promise, becoming engaged to Tsarevna Irina Mikhailovna Romanova, daughter of Michael I of Russia. The alliance was prevented by Danish objections to Valdemar's conversion to the Russian Orthodox Church, yet the king's disappointment on the betrothal's rupture was believed at the time to have hastened his death.

One of Kirsten's daughters, Countess Leonora Christina, distinguished herself by an internationally adventurous life, followed by imprisonment for decades in Denmark's royal dungeon, and by the posthumous publication of her memoirs, still well regarded both as Scandinavian prose and as early feminist literature. Despite the turmoil of her parents' marriage and the conflicts between her brothers and brothers-in-law, according to her own writings Leonora Christina's youth and early married years at the Danish royal court were happy.

Separation 
As the king's health declined in 1625, so did his temperament and his marriage.

In 1627, Kirsten fell in love with a German cavalry captain in her husband's service, the Rhinegrave Otto Ludwig of Salm-Kyrburg (1597–1634). The couple are alleged to have had encounters at Funen, Kronborg, and Copenhagen. Eventually, word came to the king of his wife's affair. Supposedly, after seeing two maids sleeping outside her locked door, he got a footman to engrave the date on a stone and did not have sex with Kirsten again. Her last daughter was born 10 months after this and he refused to accept her as legitimate, instead calling her "Miss Leftover". In the end, he formally charged Kirsten with adultery, witchcraft, and consorting with a magician in Hamburg.

His mother-in-law sought to mitigate the king's indignationseveral of her granddaughters were then engaged to marry Denmark's leading noblesby encouraging him to engage in an affair with her daughter's lady-in-waiting, Vibeke Kruse. Although the king did father children with Kruse who later became political rivals of Kirsten Munck's children and in-laws, he continued with the divorce and exiled her to Jutland in 1629. 

Kirsten herself refused to admit her adultery. After an interrogation, she was kept at Stjernholm in Horsens and then placed under house arrest in Boller in 1637. This confinement continued until 1647, allegedly owing to Vibeke Kruse's encouragement to the king to remain strict. However, Kirsten was never brought to trial despite repeated threats to that effect from the king and her good relationship with her children and in-laws led to their intercession with the king and the removal of her confinement.

Later life 
On his deathbed in 1648, her husband sent for her, but by the time she arrived he was already dead. Kirsten and her children then had Vibeke Kruse banished from court. She also had her marriage and children confirmed as legitimate, although morganatic. 

The Sons-in-law Party spoke for her in the council 1648–51, and when it fell from power, she supported her son-in-law Corfitz Ulfeldt. Ulfeldt and her daughter Leonora sided with Sweden, and Kirsten Munk is alleged to have financed King Charles X of Sweden's invasion and occupation of Denmark-Norway. She died during the Swedish occupation and was given a grand funeral in Odense.

Cultural references
The 2018 drama film Christian IV - Den sidste rejse  describes the relationship between Christian IV (Bard Ove) and Kirsten Munk. The 1998 novel Music and Silence by Rose Tremain is a fictionalized account of the disintegration of the relationship between Kirsten Munk and Christian IV, mirrored by a developing relationship between a young lady in waiting of Munk and a musician of the Royal Court.

References

  kvinfo.dk

External links

 Kirsten Munk at the website of the Royal Danish Collection

1598 births
1658 deaths
Danish nobility
Burials at St. Canute's Cathedral
Morganatic spouses
17th-century Danish people
17th-century Danish women
Christian IV of Denmark